The black-bellied fruit bat (Melonycteris melanops) is a species of order bat in the family Pteropodidae.

Ecology

Black-bellied fruit bats are endemic to the subtropical or tropical Bismarck Archipelago of Papua New Guinea. They range from sea level up to 1,600 m. Adult bats maintain a home range between 0.5 and 9.2 ha, and a core feeding area of 1 to 9 trees with active florescence. These bats enjoy the rare advantage of thriving in the changes that humans have brought to its habitat.  Most of these bats now live and eat in the banana trees of the privately owned traditional gardens and the cocoa plantations.

Black-bellied fruit bats feed on the fruit and nectar of giant native bananas and cocoa. They collect nectar by rapidly pumping their long tongues into the flowers.

Description
They have a unique countershading pattern of a black underside and burnt orange backs.

Behavior
Both males and females are resource defenders and strictly control their home range. The only crossover in home ranges is between consort pairs. Adults of the same gender are never allowed to invade a home range. Black-bellied bats spend less than 36% of their time flying while actively foraging.  By feeding at the source instead of carrying fruit back to their roost they are able to spend less time flying then other fruit bats. Mean flight time of individual flights ranges from 20.8 to 30.7 seconds, with up to 99 flights in 2 hours.

During the day, this flying fox usually roosts among dry banana leaves, a perfect camouflage given its burnt orange and black fur pattern. They roost alone, primarily within 100 m of their core-use feeding area, except for sub-adult bats who roost more than 400 m from their most frequented foraging grounds.  Sub-adult bats often have not established a territory yet and have to wait for a home range to become available or fight to claim one.

Physiology
Black-bellied fruit bats are endothermic but are poor thermoregulators. Ambient temperature plays a role in determining their body temperature. They have a basal rate metabolism of only 74% of what is expected for a mammal of its size.

Black-bellied fruit bats may enter torpor below , but the percentage is small.

Phylogeny
The black-bellied fruit bat (Melonycteris melanops) is most closely related to Melonycteris fardoulisi, and then to Macroglossus minimus and Syconycteris australis. The black-bellied back has been shown through research to be "strongly indicated as sister taxon to all other megachiropterians" and to be a primitive form of the Pteropodidae.

Notes

References

Melonycteris
Bats of Oceania
Endemic fauna of Papua New Guinea
Mammals of Papua New Guinea
Taxonomy articles created by Polbot
Mammals described in 1877
Bats of New Guinea